Cliffdale Creek is a creek in Queensland, Australia.

The headwaters of the creek rise at the eastern end of China Wall on the edge of the Barkly Tableland close to the border of the Northern Territory. The creek flows north easterly direction through the mostly uninhabited Gulf Country and eventually discharges into Elizabeth Creek which in turn lows into the Gulf of Carpentaria near Mornington Island.

See also

References

Rivers of Queensland